Plumbe is a surname. Notable people with the surname include:

John Plumbe (1809–1857), Welsh-born American photographer
Rowland Plumbe (1838–1919), English architect

See also
Plume (disambiguation)
Plumb (surname)